St Kilda is a rural locality in the Bundaberg Region, Queensland, Australia.

It may have been named after the St Kilda archipelago off the shore of Scotland.

Geography 
St Kilda is a freehold farming area with cropping in the flatter northern part of the locality and grazing in the hillier land in the rest of the locality. It is bounded in the south-west by Currajong Creek.

History 
St Kilda State School was opened on 20 November 1915 by Thomas Armfield, the Member of the Queensland Legislative Assembly for Musgrave. It was an open air school. It closed in 1922. It was on the south-east corner of Currajong Farms Road and Booths Road.

Education 
There are no schools in St Kilda. The nearest government primary schools are Wallaville State School in neighbouring Wallaville to the south-east and Gin Gin State School in Gin Gin to the north-east. The nearest government secondary school is Gin Gin State High School in Gin Gin.

References 

Bundaberg Region
Localities in Queensland